In astrodynamics or celestial mechanics, a hyperbolic trajectory or hyperbolic orbit is the trajectory of any object around a central body with more than enough speed to escape the central object's gravitational pull. The name derives from the fact that according to Newtonian theory such an orbit has the shape of a hyperbola. In more technical terms this can be expressed by the condition that the orbital eccentricity is greater than one.

Under simplistic assumptions a body traveling along this trajectory will coast towards infinity, settling to a final excess velocity relative to the central body. Similarly to parabolic trajectories, all hyperbolic trajectories are also escape trajectories. The specific energy of a hyperbolic trajectory orbit is positive.

Planetary flybys, used for gravitational slingshots, can be described within the planet's sphere of influence using hyperbolic trajectories.

Parameters describing a hyperbolic trajectory

Like an elliptical orbit, a hyperbolic trajectory for a given system can be defined (ignoring orientation) by its semi major axis and the eccentricity. However, with a hyperbolic orbit other parameters may be more useful in understanding a body's motion. The following table lists the main parameters describing the path of body following a hyperbolic trajectory around another under standard assumptions and the formula connecting them.

Semi-major axis, energy and hyperbolic excess velocity

The semi major axis is not immediately visible with an hyperbolic trajectory but can be constructed as it is the distance from periapsis to the point where the two asymptotes cross. Usually, by convention, it is negative, to keep various equations consistent with elliptical orbits.

The semi major axis is directly linked to the specific orbital energy or characteristic energy  of the orbit, and to the velocity the body attains at as the distance tends to infinity, the hyperbolic excess velocity. 
  or 

Note that the total energy is positive in the case of a hyperbolic trajectory (whereas it is negative for an elliptical orbit).

Eccentricity and angle between approach and departure
With a hyperbolic trajectory the orbital eccentricity is greater than 1. The eccentricity is directly related to the angle between the asymptotes. With eccentricity just over 1 the hyperbola is a sharp "v" shape. At  the asymptotes are at right angles. With   the asymptotes are more than 120° apart, and the periapsis distance is greater than the semi major axis. As eccentricity increases further the motion approaches a straight line.

The angle between the direction of periapsis and an asymptote from the central body is the true anomaly as distance tends to infinity, so  is the external angle between approach and departure directions (between asymptotes). Then

 or

Impact parameter and the distance of closest approach 

The impact parameter is the distance by which a body, if it continued on an unperturbed path, would miss the central body at its closest approach. With bodies experiencing gravitational forces and following hyperbolic trajectories it is equal to the semi-minor axis of the hyperbola.

In the situation of a spacecraft or comet approaching a planet, the impact parameter and excess velocity will be known accurately. If the central body is known the trajectory can now be found, including how close the approaching body will be at periapsis. If this is less than planet's radius an impact should be expected. The distance of closest approach, or periapsis distance, is given by:
 

So if a comet approaching Earth (effective radius ~6400 km) with a velocity of 12.5 km/s (the approximate minimum approach speed of a body coming from the outer Solar System) is to avoid a collision with Earth, the impact parameter will need to be at least 8600 km, or 34% more than the Earth's radius. A body approaching Jupiter (radius 70000 km) from the outer Solar System with a speed of 5.5 km/s, will need the impact parameter to be at least 770,000 km or 11 times Jupiter radius to avoid collision.

If the mass of the central body is not known, its standard gravitational parameter, and hence its mass, can be determined by the deflection of the smaller body together with the impact parameter and approach speed. Because typically all these variables can be determined accurately, a spacecraft flyby will provide a good estimate of a body's mass.

 where  is the angle the smaller body is deflected from a straight line in its course.

Equations of motion

Position

In a hyperbolic trajectory the true anomaly  is linked to the distance between the orbiting bodies by the orbit equation:

The relation between the true anomaly  and the eccentric anomaly E (alternatively the hyperbolic anomaly H) is:

     or          or   

The eccentric anomaly E is related to the mean anomaly M by Kepler's equation:

The mean anomaly is proportional to time

 where μ is a gravitational parameter  and a is the semi-major axis of the orbit.

Flight path angle

The flight path angle (φ) is the angle between the direction of velocity and the perpendicular to the radial direction, so it is zero at periapsis and tends to 90 degrees at infinity.

Velocity

Under standard assumptions the orbital speed of a body traveling along a hyperbolic trajectory can be computed from the vis-viva equation as:

where:
 is standard gravitational parameter,
 is radial distance of orbiting body from central body,
 is the (negative) semi-major axis.

Under standard assumptions, at any position in the orbit the following relation holds for orbital velocity, local escape velocity and hyperbolic excess velocity:

Note that this means that a relatively small extra delta-v above that needed to accelerate to the escape speed results in a relatively large speed at infinity. For example, at a place where escape speed is 11.2 km/s, the addition of 0.4 km/s yields a hyperbolic excess speed of 3.02 km/s.

This is an example of the Oberth effect. The converse is also true - a body does not need to be slowed by much compared to its hyperbolic excess speed (e.g. by atmospheric drag near periapsis) for velocity to fall below escape velocity and so for the body to be captured.

Radial hyperbolic trajectory
A radial hyperbolic trajectory is a non-periodic trajectory on a straight line where the relative speed of the two objects always exceeds the escape velocity. There are two cases: the bodies move away from each other or towards each other. This is a hyperbolic orbit with semi-minor axis = 0 and eccentricity = 1. Although the eccentricity is 1 this is not a parabolic orbit.

Deflection with finite sphere of influence
A more accurate formula for the deflection angle  considering the sphere of influence radius  of the deflecting body, assuming a periapsis  is:

Relativistic two-body problem
In context of the two-body problem in general relativity, trajectories of objects with enough energy to escape the gravitational pull of the other no longer are shaped like a hyperbola. Nonetheless, the term "hyperbolic trajectory" is still used to describe orbits of this type.

See also
Orbit
Orbital equation
Kepler orbit
List of orbits
Planetary flyby
Hyperbolic asteroid
Hyperbolic comet

References

External links
 Trajectories
 Orbits
 Hyperbolic

Orbits